SMAW may refer to:
Mk 153 Shoulder-Launched Multipurpose Assault Weapon, or SMAW for short
Shielded metal arc welding, the arc welding process that uses electrodes with a coated covering called flux